The Dumbrava is a left tributary of the river Pereschivul Mic in Romania. It flows into the Pereschivul Mic in Coroiești.

References

Rivers of Romania
Rivers of Vaslui County